The Philadelphia Barrage played their fourth season, as a charter member of the MLL (originally known as the Bridgeport Barrage), during the 2004 season of Major League Lacrosse.  The Barrage played in Bridgeport, Connecticut from the 2001 to the 2003 season and relocated to the Philadelphia suburb of Villanova for the 2004 season.  The Barrage ended up in 2nd place in the American Division with a record of 7-5.  They qualified for the MLL Playoffs for the first time in franchise history.  In the semi finals, they defeated the Rochester Rattlers 18-17 in OT at Nickerson Field on August 20, 2004.  The Barrage won their 1st MLL Championship by defeating the Boston Cannons 13-11 in the MLL Championship Game at Nickerson Field on August 22, 2004.

Schedule

Playoffs

References

Major League Lacrosse seasons
Philadelphia Barrage Season, 2004
Philadelphia Barrage